Sentek Global is a technology service provider for the US government. The company's offerings are primarily related to IT security program management, but also includes Risk management framework (RMF) and leadership training.

Sentek Global was founded in 2001 and currently has three offices; two in San Diego, California, and one in Charleston, South Carolina. The company employs more than 170 individuals full-time and is privately held.

The San Diego Business Journal named Sentek Global to its "Fastest Growing, Privately Held Companies" list four years in a row, from 2007 to 2010. The company was also listed on Inc. Magazines "Inc. 5,000" list during the same time period.

Founder credentials
Eric Basu, founder of Sentek Global, was an active duty U.S. Navy SEAL officer from October 1988 to December 1997 and served as a reserve SEAL from 1997 to 2005. He was Chief Architect of Knowledge Management Portal for Alitum, and a project manager for KPMG and Price Waterhouse Coopers. Basu was the President for Global Entertainment Security, Inc. until 2006 and currently sits on their board of advisors. He graduated from UCLA with an MBA, and is currently a regular contributor to Forbes.com.

Contracts
In 2011, Sentek was awarded a $70-million, 5-year contract from the U.S. Navy's Space and Naval Warfare Systems Command. The contract is for information assurance, systems engineering, and other services related to software and implementation.

Prior to that, the company was awarded two five-year, $32-million contracts in as many months from U.S. Navy's Space and Naval Warfare Systems Command to conduct similar duties.

Articles by Sentek Global executives
BusinessWeek  "Three Ways to Make Your Small Business 'Bankable'", by Eric Basu.
Signal Magazine  "The Vulnerability of Technology", by Hamlin Tallent and Thomas Lang. 
Defense Systems Magazine  "Bridging the SOA divide for deployed assets", by Cameron Matthews.

Notes

Defense companies of the United States
Companies based in San Diego